21 Chump Street is a fourteen-minute one-act musical with book, music and lyrics by Lin-Manuel Miranda, who is known for creating the Broadway musicals In the Heights, Bring It On the Musical, and Hamilton.  The show was based on the second act of episode #457 of This American Life, titled "What I Did For Love" and reported by Robbie Brown, in which a high school student, Justin Laboy, falls in love with an undercover police officer, and is ultimately arrested for selling drugs to the officer in an attempt to impress her. The musical is based on this real event and the writer even chose to keep Justin's name in the show. The title is a satirical reference to the 1987 TV show 21 Jump Street which was about undercover narcotics agents in a high school. The musical premiered in a showcase put on by This American Life, held at the Brooklyn Academy of Music on June 7, 2014, and broadcast as episode #528, "The Radio Drama Episode".

Synopsis 
The show opens with the narrator telling the audience about a plan called 'Operation D-Minus.' He introduces Justin Laboy, an eighteen-year-old senior honors student attending Park Vista Community High School in Lake Worth, Florida. Justin meets a new student, Naomi Rodriguez, and instantly gets an overwhelming crush on her.

Naomi does not answer Justin's repeated requests about what he needs to do to make her fall in love with him, and Justin asks Naomi to go to prom. Though other students say that Naomi rejected him, Justin insists that she tells him that she'll think about it, and he is overjoyed ("What the Heck I Gotta Do"). Naomi confirms to the Narrator that she was asked to prom but denies ever telling him she would think about it. The Narrator then reveals that Naomi is a twenty-five-year-old undercover cop trying to learn which students are dealing drugs.

Naomi goes up to Justin and asks him if he smokes, Justin misinterprets this as Naomi saying she does drugs and is trying to find a dealer. Justin tells her he doesn't, but if that's what she needs to go to prom with him, then he'll get her marijuana. He then divulges to the Narrator that he has no idea what he's doing, but he just cares too much about Naomi to have told her no ("One School").

Justin calls a cousin, who in turn calls up a seemingly endless cycle of others to get the marijuana. Three cousins argue if they should help Justin and are surprised that he would even ask such a thing due to his being a successful student. Meanwhile, Justin is asked by Naomi about the marijuana. Eventually, Justin gets the drugs by telling them that he's in love. One of them hands Justin a bag of marijuana pellets, and he goes off to find Naomi ("Cousin").

Naomi asks Justin to meet at school the next day. Justin refuses Naomi's money though, insisting that the marijuana is a gift to prove just how much he cares about her. Knowing that she can't properly bust him without the monetary transaction, she shoves it into Justin's hands just as the teacher comes into the room keeping him from returning it and Justin kisses her ("The Money").

Because Justin is over eighteen and sold drugs on school grounds, the Narrator explains Justin had made an "irreversibly bad decision." Naomi reiterates that she's doing the right thing, though she seems to be upset about what she's done and Justin seemed like a good kid. She explains that there are smart and defenseless kids that she thinks about after the job is over, obviously talking about Justin.

In May, the police arrest Justin and other students. Justin realizes that he'll lose in court, and pleads guilty. Justin receives three years' probation and has to spend a week in jail, while the other students point out that he'll never get into college now.

Later, Naomi sits with the Narrator and discusses the effects drugs have had on her family while growing up. She states that she's doing the right thing, and wishes that someone had done her job when she was in school. However, she admits that she's never going to forget Justin, and that he touched her heart.

During his time in jail, Justin can't stop thinking about Naomi. The Narrator asks Justin what he would say to Naomi if she was in the room with them. Justin responds, echoing his earlier sentiments: "What the heck did you do?" ("Epilogue").

Musical numbers 

The show is performed in one act, and is only fifteen minutes in length. The characters of the students, cousins, and cops are played by three ensemble members. 
 "What the Heck I Gotta Do" – Justin, Narrator, Naomi, Tevin, Derek, and Andrew
 "One School" – Naomi, Narrator, Justin
 "Cousin" – Cousin 1, Cousin 2, Justin, Narrator, and Naomi
 "The Money" – Naomi, Justin, Narrator, Tevin, Derek, and Andrew 
 "Epilogue" – Narrator, Naomi, Justin, Cop, Lawyer, and Boy

Original casts

References 

2014 musicals
Musicals by Lin-Manuel Miranda
Musicals inspired by real-life events
Plays set in Florida
This American Life